Udyog Nagar is a station on the Green Line of the Delhi Metro and is located in the West Delhi district of Delhi. It is an elevated station and was inaugurated on 2 April 2010.

Prominent house colonies here are Inder Enclave, Mianwali Nagar, Sunder Vihar, Jwala Puri, Shiv Vihar-Poojary Apartments, Defence Apartments, Lord Buddha Society, Vindhyachal Apartments, Virat Apartments and Tribhuvan Apartments in Bhera Enclave.

History

Station layout

Exit

Gate No 1- Jwalapuri, Nihal Vihar, Guru Harkishan Nagar, Shiv Vihar-Poojary Apartments, Inder Enclave

Gate No 2- Udyog Nagar Industrial Area, Mangolpuri, Nangloi Bus Depot

Connections

See also
List of Delhi Metro stations
Transport in Delhi
Delhi Metro Rail Corporation
Delhi Suburban Railway
List of rapid transit systems in India

References

External links

 Delhi Metro Rail Corporation Ltd. (Official site) 
 Delhi Metro Annual Reports
 
 UrbanRail.Net – descriptions of all metro systems in the world, each with a schematic map showing all stations.

Delhi Metro stations
Railway stations opened in 2010
Railway stations in West Delhi district